The 1989–90 Georgia Tech Yellow Jackets men's basketball team represented the Georgia Institute of Technology during the 1989–90 NCAA men's basketball season. Led by 9th year head coach Bobby Cremins and the talented trio dubbed "Lethal Weapon 3" – ACC Player of the Year Dennis Scott, National Freshman of the Year Kenny Anderson, and Brian Oliver – the Yellow Jackets were ACC tournament champions and reached the 1990 Final Four.

Roster

Schedule

|-
!colspan=8 style=| Non-conference regular season
|-

|-
!colspan=8 style=| ACC regular season
|-

|-
!colspan=8 style=| ACC tournament
|-

|-
!colspan=8 style=| NCAA tournament
|-

Rankings

Awards
 All-Americans
 Dennis Scott – Consensus 2nd Team
 Kenny Anderson – 3rd Team (AP), 2nd Team (NABC)

 Wayman Tisdale Award (National Freshman of the Year)
 Kenny Anderson

 Naismith College Coach of the Year
 Bobby Cremins

 ACC Player of the Year
 Dennis Scott

 ACC Rookie of the Year
 Kenny Anderson

Players in the 1990 NBA draft

References

Georgia Tech Yellow Jackets men's basketball seasons
Georgia Tech
NCAA Division I men's basketball tournament Final Four seasons
Georgia Tech